Gordon William Humphreys Richardson, Baron Richardson of Duntisbourne  (25 November 1915 – 22 January 2010) was a British banker, former lawyer, and former Governor of the Bank of England.

Biography
Richardson was born to John Robert and Nellie Richardson, and was educated at Nottingham High School and Gonville and Caius College, Cambridge.

He served during World War II and became a Member of the Order of the British Empire, Military Division, in 1944. He was called to the bar at Gray's Inn in 1946, becoming a member of the Bar Council between 1951 and 1955, but abandoned law for a career in the City. He became a director of J. Henry Schroder & Co in 1957, and was later chairman between 1962 and 1973.

He was appointed Governor of the Bank of England in 1973, and remained in that position until 1983.  November 1973 saw a run on London and County Securities, marking the start of the secondary banking crisis.

While serving as governor, Richardson joined the Privy Council (1976) and was awarded the Territorial Decoration (1979). He was created a life peer as Baron Richardson of Duntisbourne, of Duntisbourne in the County of Gloucestershire, and a Knight Companion of the Order of the Garter, both in 1983.

In February 1978, Richardson delivered the inaugural Mais Lecture, entitled "Reflections on the Conduct of Monetary Policy". Since then, the annual lecture has come to be regarded as leading event in the banking and financial community of the City of London, hosting each of the subsequent Bank of England Governors, as well as Prime Ministers, Chancellors of the Exchequer, and European Central Bankers.

Richardson was a member of the Morgan Stanley advisory board from 1984. Between 1985 and 1991, he was a member of the Group of Thirty, and thereafter remained as their Honorary Chair.  He was chairman of the Pilgrim Trust from 1984 to 1989.

On the evening of 22 January 2010, the Bank of England released a statement announcing Richardson's death.

Arms

Footnotes

References

External links
 Lord Richardson of Duntisbourne – Daily Telegraph obituary

1915 births
2010 deaths
Alumni of Gonville and Caius College, Cambridge
British bankers
Crossbench life peers
Deputy Lieutenants of Gloucestershire
Knights of the Garter
Members of the Order of the British Empire
Members of Gray's Inn
Members of the Privy Council of the United Kingdom
Governors of the Bank of England
British Army personnel of World War II
Royal Artillery officers
People educated at Nottingham High School
Schroders people
20th-century English businesspeople
Life peers created by Elizabeth II